Poris Station (PI) is a class III railway station located in Poris Gaga, Batuceper, Tangerang. The station, which is located at an altitude of +7 meters, is included in the Jakarta Operational Area I, is the easternmost train station in Tangerang, and only serves the KRL Commuterline route.

Building and layout 
This station has two railway tracks, where both of them are straight tracks.

Services
The following is a list of train services at the Poris Station.

Passenger services 
 KAI Commuter

Intermodal support

Gallery

References

External links
 

Tangerang
Railway stations in Banten